Johndro is a surname. Notable people with the surname include:

Ellei Johndro (born 1979), American photographer
Franklin Johndro (1835–1901), Union Army soldier in the American Civil War